Leonotis is a genus of flowering plants in the family Lamiaceae. One species, Leonotis nepetifolia, is native to tropical Africa and southern India. It is naturalized throughout most of the tropics. The other species are endemic to southern  + eastern Africa.

Leonotis was named by Robert Brown in 1810 in Prodromus Florae Novae Hollandiae et Insulae Van Diemen. The name means "lion's ear".

The type for the genus is the specimen of Leonotis ocymifolia that was originally described as Leonotis leonitis. It is a specimen of Leonotis ocymifolia var. ocymifolia.

Species
 Leonotis decadonta  Gürke  - southeast Africa from Burundi + Tanzania south to Mozambique
 Leonotis goetzei  Gürke  - Tanzania
 Leonotis grandis  Iwarsson & Y.B. Harvey      - Tanzania, Malawi, Zambia
 Leonotis leonurus  (L.) Robert Brown  - South Africa, Angola; naturalized in Burundi, Java, St. Helena
 Leonotis myricifolia  Iwarsson & Y.B. Harvey  - Tanzania, Malawi, Zambia
 Leonotis myrothamnifolia  Iwarsson & Y.B. Harvey  - Malawi, Zambia
 Leonotis nepetifolia   (L.) Robert Brown  - sub-Saharan Africa from Ethiopia west to Senegal and south to Transvaal, also Indian subcontinent; naturalized in Morocco, Canary Islands, Southeast Asia, New Caledonia, French Polynesia, much of Latin America; West Indies
 Leonotis ocymifolia (Burman f.) Iwarsson  - eastern Africa from Sudan + Eritrea south to Transvaal
 Leonotis pole-evansii Hutch. - Zambia

Taxonomy
Leonotis is a member of the subfamily Lamioideae. Leonotis might be paraphyletic or even polyphyletic because Leonotis leonurus is not closely related to the other species. In 2009, it was shown that Leonotis and 3 other genera are embedded in Leucas, a genus of about 100 species. If the 4 embedded genera were merged with Leucas, the expanded Leucas would have about 132 species.

References

External links

 Leonotis (page 504) In: Prodromus Florae Novae Hollandiae et Insulae Van Diemen At: bibliography/3678 At:Biodiversity Heritage Library
 Leonotis At:Index Nominum Genericorum At: References At: NMNH Department of Botany
 Classification for Kingdom Plantae Down to Genus  Leonotis, United States Department of Agriculture
 German Lion's-Tail Forum
 IPNI Listing

Lamiaceae
Lamiaceae genera